The 2020–21 Northern Iowa Panthers men's basketball team represented the University of Northern Iowa during the 2020–21 NCAA Division I men's basketball season. The Panthers, led by 15th-year head coach Ben Jacobson, played their home games at the McLeod Center in Cedar Falls, Iowa as members of the Missouri Valley Conference. In a season limited due to the ongoing COVID-19 pandemic, the Panthers finished the season 10–15, 7–11 in MVC play to finish in a three-way tie for fifth place. As the No. 7 seed in the MVC tournament, they defeated Illinois State in the first round before being forced to forfeit their quarterfinal game against Drake due to positive COVID-19 tests.

Previous season
The Panthers finished the 2019–20 season 25–6, 14–4 in MVC play to win the MVC regular season championship. They lost in the quarterfinals of the MVC tournament to Drake. As a regular season conference champion who failed to win their conference tournament, they were set to receive an automatic bid to NIT. However, all postseason tournaments were thereafter canceled due to the ongoing COVID-19 pandemic.

Offseason

Departures

2020 recruiting class

2021 recruiting class

Roster

Schedule and results

|-
!colspan=9 style=| Regular season

|-
!colspan=12 style=| MVC tournament
 
 

Source

References

Northern Iowa Panthers men's basketball seasons
Northern Iowa
Panth
Panth